Tonny is a 1962 Norwegian drama film directed by Nils R. Müller and Per Gjersøe. It was entered into the 12th Berlin International Film Festival.

Cast
 Per Christensen as Tonny
 Wenche Foss as Tonnys mor
 Liv Ullmann as Kari
 Joachim Calmeyer as Rørleggeren
 Rolf Daleng as Alfred
 Finn Kvalem as Rødtopp
 Ola B. Johannessen as Politimann
 Henny Skjønberg as Dame med parasoll
 Helga Backe
 Finn Bernhoft
 Erik Melbye Brekke
 Synnøve Gleditsch
 Rolf Nannestad
 Alfred Solaas

References

External links

1962 films
1960s Norwegian-language films
1962 drama films
Norwegian black-and-white films
Films directed by Nils R. Müller
Norwegian drama films